

Dinosaurs

Newly named dinosaurs

Synapsids

Non-mammalian

See also

References

1840s in paleontology
Paleontology